Andrew John Ashworth, CBE, KC (Hon), FBA (born 11 October 1947) was the Vinerian Professor of English Law at the University of Oxford from 1997 to 2013, a Fellow of All Souls College, and was formerly Chairman of the Sentencing Advisory Panel before it was abolished in 2010.  He gained his LLB in 1968 from the London School of Economics, a BCL from Oxford in 1970, and a PhD in 1973 from the University of Manchester. He attended Rishworth School in West Yorkshire.

Ashworth was appointed Commander of the Order of the British Empire (CBE) in the 2009 Birthday Honours.

Publishing
He has written extensively on English criminal law, and was for some several years the Editor of the Criminal Law Review.

Teaching
Ashworth teaches courses on the Bachelor of Civil Law course. He has also supervised research students on Oxford's various legal research courses.

Views
Ashworth through his works has shown much resentment towards the approach of the British Parliament to basic principles of criminal justice. He advocates respect for the presumption of innocence and has written a considerable number of articles on different areas of law of evidence.

References

External links
 Andrew Ashworth at Oxford Law

1947 births
Living people
English legal scholars
English non-fiction writers
Fellows of All Souls College, Oxford
People from Rochdale
Commanders of the Order of the British Empire
Vinerian Professors of English Law
English male non-fiction writers
Honorary King's Counsel
Alumni of the University of Manchester
Alumni of the London School of Economics
Alumni of the University of Oxford